Puff the Magic Dragon or variation, may refer to:

 "Puff, the Magic Dragon" (song) is a 1963 song by Peter, Paul and Mary based on the eponymous poem
 "Puff, the Magic Dragon" (poem)" is a 1958 poem by Lenny Lipton, the basis of the eponymous song
 Puff the Magic Dragon (TV franchise), a series of U.S. animated TV specials from Fred Wolf Films
 Puff the Magic Dragon (TV special), a 1978 U.S. animated TV program based on the eponymous song
 Douglas AC-47, a USAF flying gunship nicknamed "Puff the Magic Dragon", named after the song
 Reg Gasnier (1939–2014), an Australian rugby league player who was nicknamed "Puff the Magic Dragon"

See also

 Puff the Magic Dragon in the Land of the Living Lies (TV special), a 1979 sequel animated U.S. TV program to the 1978 special
 Puff and the Incredible Mr. Nobody (TV special), a 1982 U.S. animated TV program sequel to the 1978 and 1979 specials
 Piff the Magic Dragon (born 1980), a British comedian and magician
 Stuff the Magic Dragon, the team mascot for the Orlando Magic
 
 Puff (disambiguation)
 Magic (disambiguation)
 Dragon (disambiguation)
 Magic Dragon (disambiguation)